Sean Hingorani (born October 13, 2006) is an American professional stock car racing driver. He competes full-time in the ARCA Menards Series East and West, as well part-time in the ARCA Menards Series, driving the No. 15 Toyota Camry for Venturini Motorsports.

Racing career 
Hingorani had raced in the Southwest for the majority of his early racing career, running legends cars in 2021, whilst running the Silver State Road Course Championship, where he would win the championship.

In 2022, Hingorani would make his ARCA Menards Series West debut at Evergreen Speedway, driving the No. 4 Toyota for Eric Nascimento, whose team Hingorani had raced for in late-model competition. In the race, he would start seventh, and would finish 14th due to a crash while running in the top-five. He would make four more starts that year, qualifying in the top ten three times, and achieving a best finish of 12th at Portland International Raceway.

On January 18, 2023, it was announced that Hingorani would run in the ARCA Menards Series East full-time for Venturini Motorsports in the No. 15 Toyota. On February 15, it was announced that Hingorani would also compete full time in the ARCA Menards Series West as well, running for both East and West championships.

Motorsports results

ARCA Menards Series
(key) (Bold – Pole position awarded by qualifying time. Italics – Pole position earned by points standings or practice time. * – Most laps led. ** – All laps led.)

ARCA Menards Series East

ARCA Menards Series West

References

Living people
2006 births
Racing drivers from California
People from Newport Beach, California
ARCA Menards Series drivers